SMG Studio is an independent video game developer based in Sydney, Australia. They are best known for their video games Death Squared (2017), Moving Out (2020), and the One More series. Their first release, Over The Top Tower Defence, first launched for mobile devices on May 24, 2014.

SMG Studio was one of ten companies which received funding from Screen Australia's Games Enterprise in 2013.

Products 
 ThumbZilla (2011)
Over The Top Tower Defence (2014)
 One More Line (2014)
 One More Dash (2015)
 Risk: Global Domination (2015)
 One More Bounce (2016)
 Thumb Drift (2016)
 Death Squared (2017)
 Super One More Jump (2018)
 No Way Home (2020)
 Moving Out (2020)
SP!NG (2021)

References 

Video game development companies
Video game companies of Australia
Video game companies established in 2013
Australian companies established in 2013
Companies based in Sydney
Indie video game developers